The Hatch-class lifeboat was part of the A-class of lifeboats formerly operated by the Royal National Lifeboat Institution of the United Kingdom and Ireland. It was essentially a Dell Quay Dory modified for RNLI use.

It was replaced by the Atlantic 21.

Fleet

References

External links
RNLI Fleet 

Royal National Lifeboat Institution lifeboats